Gavin Meadows (born 8 September 1977 in Bradford, West Yorkshire) is a former international freestyle swimmer for England and Great Britain.

Swimming career
Meadows competed at the 2004 Summer Olympics for Great Britain. A member of the City of Leeds Swim Club he is best known for winning the 1997 European title in the men's 4×200 m freestyle relay, alongside Paul Palmer, Andrew Clayton and James Salter.

He represented England in six events and won four medals, at the 1998 Commonwealth Games in Kuala Lumpur, Malaysia. Three of the medals came in the relay events and he also won an individual bronze in the 100 metres freestyle.

He is a three times winner of the ASA National Championship 100 metres freestyle title (1996, 1997, 1999) and won the 200 metres freestyle in 1996.

See also
 List of Commonwealth Games medallists in swimming (men)

References

1977 births
Living people
English male freestyle swimmers
Olympic swimmers of Great Britain
Swimmers at the 2004 Summer Olympics
Sportspeople from Bradford
Commonwealth Games silver medallists for England
Commonwealth Games bronze medallists for England
Swimmers at the 1998 Commonwealth Games
World Aquatics Championships medalists in swimming
Medalists at the FINA World Swimming Championships (25 m)
European Aquatics Championships medalists in swimming
Commonwealth Games medallists in swimming
Medallists at the 1998 Commonwealth Games